The 1987 Atlantic Coast Conference baseball tournament was the 1987 postseason baseball championship of the NCAA Division I Atlantic Coast Conference, held at Greenville Municipal Stadium in Greenville, South Carolina, from May 11 through 15.  defeated  in the championship game, earning the conference's automatic bid to the 1987 NCAA Division I baseball tournament.

Format 
All eight ACC teams qualified for the eight-team double-elimination tournament.

Seeding Procedure 
From TheACC.com:
On Saturday (The Semifinals) of the ACC baseball tournament, the match-up between the four remaining teams is determined by previous opponents. If teams have played previously in the tournament, every attempt will be made to avoid a repeat match-up between teams, regardless of seed. If it is impossible to avoid a match-up that already occurred, then the determination is based on avoiding the most recent, current tournament match-up, regardless of seed. If no match-ups have occurred, the team left in the winners bracket will play the lowest seeded team from the losers bracket.

Regular season results

Tournament

All-tournament team

See also 
 College World Series
 NCAA Division I Baseball Championship
 Atlantic Coast Conference baseball tournament

References 

Tournament
Atlantic Coast Conference baseball tournament
Atlantic Coast Conference baseball tournament
Atlantic Coast Conference baseball tournament
College baseball tournaments in South Carolina
Baseball competitions in Greenville, South Carolina